Patara is a town in Hamirpur distice in the state of Uttar Pradesh, India. 
Patara is a Development Block in Ghatampur tehsil.

Transport
Patara is well connected to rest of India by rail and road.

Geography

See also
 Padri Lalpur

References

Near town
Bidanu
Ramipur

Cities and towns in Kanpur Nagar district